Betty Aol Ochan, is a Ugandan teacher and politician, who has served as the Leader of Opposition in Uganda's Parliament since 3 August 2018. She was appointed to that position by Patrick Amuriat, the president of Forum for Democratic Change (FDC), the largest opposition party in the 10th Parliament (2016–2021).

She served as the incumbent elected member of parliament representing Gulu District in Uganda's 10th Parliament.

Background and education
Ochan was born on 28 November 1958. She attended Makerere University, Uganda's largest and oldest public university, graduating with a Diploma in Education in 1981. In 2006, she was awarded a Bachelor of Development Studies degree by Gulu University. Her Master of Development Studies degree was obtained from Uganda Martyrs University. She also holds a number of certificates in rural development, leadership and social work, from local and international institutions.

Career
Prior to joining politics, Ochan was a secondary school teacher from 1981 to 1990. Half of that time, until 1985, was spent at Layibi College, while the remainder of her teaching career was spent at Awere Secondary School.

In 1990, she took up employment with the Kenya-based non-profit organization ACORD, based at its offices in Gulu, as a Rural Development Worker, serving in that capacity until 1995. She then worked as a program officer at St. Muritz Catholic Parish for two years until 1997.

For the next nine years, until 2006, Ochan was a member of Gulu District Council. In 2006, she was elected to the Ugandan Parliament on the FDC political party ticket. She has been a member of parliament ever since.

References

Members of the Parliament of Uganda
Ugandan educators
1958 births
Living people
Women members of the Parliament of Uganda
Gulu University alumni
Forum for Democratic Change politicians
Makerere University alumni
Uganda Martyrs University alumni
People from Gulu District
People from Northern Region, Uganda
21st-century Ugandan politicians
21st-century Ugandan women politicians